The South African Chess Championship was first organised in 1892 by the Cape Town Chess Club. It is now organised by Chess South Africa (CHESSA), the governing body of chess in South Africa. The tournament is normally held every two years. It is restricted to chess players resident in South Africa (although exceptions have been made on occasion) and participation is by invitation only.

CHESSA was formed in 1992, after unification talks between various chess bodies that commenced the previous year. The 1995 event, the first organised by CHESSA, included titled players from Angola and Zimbabwe and was run on the Swiss system. Since that date, the tournament has been held on a round-robin basis. The winner of the tournament holds the title of South African Closed Chess Champion until the next tournament is held.

Historically, the tournament was usually held on a round-robin or double round-robin basis. In case of a tie for first place, a playoff match was usually conducted. In the early days, the title holder could also be challenged to a title match, and these matches are tabled below.

Winners of the national championship

{| class="sortable wikitable"
! Year !! City !! Winner
!Black Closed Winner|| Women's Winner
|-
|	1892	||	Cape Town	||	Arthur Rivett 	Edward Roberts
|
|-
|	1897	||	Cape Town	||	Edward Roberts
|-
|	1899	||	Durban	||	Abraham Michael
|-
|	1903	||	Johannesburg	||	Francis Joseph Lee
|-
|	1906	||	Cape Town	||	Bruno Edgar Siegheim
|-
|	1910	||	Cape Town	||	Harry Duhan
|-
|	1912	||	Johannesburg	||	Bruno Edgar Siegheim
|-
|	1920	||	Cape Town	||	A.J.A. Cameron 	Alexander Chavkin
|-
|	1924	||	Durban	||	Alexander Chavkin
|-
|	1926	||	Johannesburg	||	Max Blieden
|-
|	1928	||	Cape Town	||	Max Blieden
|-
|	1935	||	Johannesburg	||	John C. Archer jr
|-
|	1937	||	Cape Town	||	Kurt Dreyer
|-
|	1939	||	Durban	||	Wolfgang Heidenfeld
|-
|	1945	||Johannesburg	||	Wolfgang Heidenfeld  John Holford
|-
|	1947	||	Cape Town	||	Wolfgang Heidenfeld  Kurt Dreyer
|-
|	1949	||	Durban	||	Wolfgang Heidenfeld
|-
|	1951	||	East London	||	Wolfgang Heidenfeld
|-
|	1953	||	Johannesburg	||	John E. Eriksen
|-
|	1955	||	Cape Town	||	Wolfgang Heidenfeld
|-
|	1957	||	Durban	||	Wolfgang Heidenfeld
|-
|	1959	||	Johannesburg	||	Wolfgang Heidenfeld Kenneth Kirby
|-
|	1961	||	Cape Town	||	Woolf Gerber
|-
|	1963	||	Pretoria	||	Kenneth Kirby Kees van der Meyden
|-
|	1965	||	Salisbury	||	Piet Kroon
|-
|	1967	||	Johannesburg	||	David Friedgood
|-
|	1969	||	Pretoria	||	Piet Kroon
|-
|	1971	||	Johannesburg	||	David Friedgood
|-
|	1973	||	Cape Town	||	David Friedgood
|-
|	1975	||	East London	||	Piet KroonCharles de Villiers
|-
|	1977	||	Pretoria	||	David A. Walker	Charles de Villiers
|-
|	1979	||	Johannesburg	||	Frank Korostenski
|-
|	1981	||	Cape Town	||	Charles de Villiers
|-
|	1983	||	Pretoria	||	Donald Macfarlane
|-
|	1985	||	Johannesburg	||	Clyde Wolpe Charles de Villiers
|-
|1986
|
|
|Shabier Bhawoodien (Durban)
|-
|	1987	||Pretoria||Charles de Villiers
|Deon Pick (Worcester)
|-
|1988
|
|
|Maxwell Solomon (East London)
|-
|	1989	||Secunda||Charles de Villiers
|Deon Solomon (Bellville South)
|-
|1991
|
|
|Deon Solomon(CPUT Campus)
|-
|1993
|Cape Town
|George Michelakis
|
|-
|1994
|CPUT Campus
|Deon Solomon
|
|-
|	1995	||Cape Town||David Gluckman
|
|-
|	1998	||Bruma Lake||Mark Rubery  Watu Kobese
|-
|	2000	||Port Elizabeth||Nicholas van der Nat
|
|Michelle Minnaar
|-
|2001
|
|Watu Kobese
|
|Cecile van der Merwe
|-
|2002
|
|
|
|Mignon Pretorius
|-
|	2003	||Kempton Park||Watu Kobese  Kenny Solomon
|
|Mignon Pretorius
|-
|2004
|
|
|
|Carmen de Jager
|-
|	2005	||Cape Town||Nicholas van der Nat
|
|Denise Frick
|-
|	2007	||Cape Town||Henry Robert Steel
|
|?
|-
|2008
|
|
|
|Carmen de Jager
|-
|	2009	||Cape Town||Nicholas van der Nat
|
|no event held
|-
|	2011	||Cape Town||Henry Robert Steel  Watu Kobese
|
|no event held
|-
|2013
|Cape Town
|Donovan van den Heever
|
|Denise Frick
|-
|	2015	||Cape Town||Daniel Cawdery
|
|Denise Frick
|-
|	2017	||Cape Town||Johannes Mabusela, Calvin Klaasen
| ||Jesse February
|-
|	2019	||Cape Town||Daniel Barrish
| ||Jesse February
|-
|	2022	||Cape Town||Daniel Cawdery
| ||Chloe Badenhorst
|}

Winners of the South African Title
 1897 Edward Roberts (defeated Arthur Cameron in challenge)
 1898 Edward Roberts (defeated P.G. Van Breda in challenge)
 1910 Max Blieden (defeated Bruno Edgar Siegheim in challenge)
 1911 Bruno Edgar Siegheim (defeated Harry Duhan in challenge)
 1912 Bruno Edgar Siegheim (defeated Henk Meihuizen in challenge)

References

 A History of Chess in Southern Africa, by Leonard Reitstein (2003), . This covers the period from 1892 until 1945.
 South African Chessplayer, edited by Leonard Reitstein, published from 1953 to 1986.
 Guinness Chess: The Records, by Ken Whyld (1986), page 114. This list covers the period from 1892 until 1986.
 Chess In The RSA, edited by Charles van der Westhuizen and others, published from 1987 to 1990.
 Chess in Southern Africa, edited by Mark Levitt and others, published from 1991 to 1995.
 The Week In Chess (TWIC) by Mark Crowther. Refer to TWIC187 for 1998, TWIC286 for 2000, TWIC451 for 2003, TWIC548 for 2005, TWIC685 for 2007, TWIC791 for 2009, TWIC892 for 2011.  
 On the 1924 championships: 

Chess national championships
Championship
South African culture
1892 establishments in the Cape Colony
Chess